Aloysia is a genus of flowering plants. It is also a feminine given name that may refer to the following people

First name
Aloysia Weber (1760 – 1839), German soprano
Aloysia Sygaea Toletana (1522 – 1560), Spanish poet

Middle name
Anna Aloysia Maximiliane von Lamberg (? - 1738), Austrian countess
Maria Aloysia of Dietrichstein (1700 – 1783), German noblewoman

Mary Aloysia Hardey (1809 – 1886), American religious sister

See also
Aloisia